Hortoonops is a genus of spiders in the family Oonopidae. It was first described in 2012 by Platnick & Dupérré. , it contains 3 species.

References

Oonopidae
Araneomorphae genera
Spiders of the Caribbean